The Best of Laura Pausini: E ritorno da te (English: "The Best of Laura Pausini: And Back to You") is a compilation album of Italian singer Laura Pausini's greatest hits, issued by CGD East West (Warner) Records in 2001. Lo mejor de Laura Pausini: Volveré junto a ti is its Spanish language edition released for the hispanophone market.

In addition to its collected tracks (between which are included new versions of her first hits), the album features four new tracks "E ritorno da te" (Spanish: "Volveré junto a ti"), "Una storia che vale" (Spanish: "Dos historias iguales"), "One More Time" (originally recorded in 1999) and "Dime" (included only on the Spanish edition). Between October 2001 and June 2002, Pausini held the 2001/2002 World Tour, to support and promote the album worldwide, this is another hit for Laura because the album it has managed to sell over 3 million copies worldwide.

The track "One More Time" was originally present on the soundtrack of the 1999 motion picture "Message in a Bottle", where it played during the credits. The song "Speranza", only present at the Platinum edition of the album, was the theme song of the Brazilian soap opera "Esperança", which was broadcast from June 2002 to February 2003.

Track listing

The Best of Laura Pausini: E ritorno da te

Lo mejor de Laura Pausini: Volveré junto a ti

Charts

Weekly Charts

Year-end charts

Certifications and sales

References 

Laura Pausini compilation albums
Spanish-language compilation albums
Italian-language compilation albums
2001 greatest hits albums
Compagnia Generale del Disco albums